Arthur Sandes (1793 in Dublin or Kerry – 6 September 1832 in Cuenca, Ecuador) was the commanding officer of the Rifle Battalion of the British Legions in the Spanish American wars of independence.
Sandes came to Venezuela to join the Regiment of Rifles led by Colonel Frederick Campbell taking part in the "expedition of the Five Colonels" but Rifles never reached his destination. 
In the following years Sandes fought in various battles in Colombia, Ecuador, Peru and Venezuela.

References

External links
 Arthur Sandes (1793-1832), commander of the Rifles Battalion in the South American wars of independence

People of the Spanish American wars of independence
1793 births
1832 deaths